The alphabetical index of philosophy is so large it had to be broken up into several pages.  To look up a topic in philosophy, click on the first letter of its name. To find topics by core area, field, major philosophical tradition, or time periods, see the subheadings further below.

Philosophy contents

Lists 
List articles are pages consisting of a lead section followed by a list (which may or may not be divided by headings). The items on these lists include links to articles in a particular subject area, and may include additional information about the listed items.

List of philosophers
List of philosophical concepts
List of philosophical literature
List of philosophical organizations
List of philosophies 
List of philosophy awards 
List of philosophy anniversaries
List of schools of philosophy

Philosophy articles 
Index of philosophy articles (A–C)
Index of philosophy articles (D–H)
Index of philosophy articles (I–Q)
Index of philosophy articles (R–Z)

Core areas of philosophy 
Index of aesthetics articles
Index of epistemology articles
Index of ethics articles
Index of logic articles
Index of metaphysics articles
Index of social and political philosophy articles

Other fields of philosophy 
Index of philosophy of law articles
Index of philosophy of language articles
Index of philosophy of mind articles
Index of philosophy of religion articles
Index of philosophy of science articles

History of philosophy 
Index of ancient philosophy articles
Index of medieval philosophy articles
Index of modern philosophy articles
Index of contemporary philosophy articles

Major traditions in philosophy 
Index of analytic philosophy articles
Index of continental philosophy articles
Index of Eastern philosophy articles

Lists of philosophers 

List of philosophers (A–C)
List of philosophers (D–H)
List of philosophers (I–Q)
List of philosophers (R–Z)
List of female philosophers

Philosophers by area of study 
List of aestheticians
List of ethicists
List of epistemologists
List of logicians
List of metaphysicians
List of philosophers of science
List of philosophers of technology
List of political philosophers
List of social and political philosophers

Philosophers by major tradition 
List of analytic philosophers
List of ancient Platonists
List of continental philosophers
List of critical theorists
List of existentialists
List of phenomenologists
List of thinkers influenced by deconstruction
List of utilitarians
List of Eastern philosophers
List of scholastic philosophers

Philosophers by period 
List of philosophers born in the centuries BC
List of philosophers born in the 1st through 10th centuries
List of philosophers born in the 11th through 14th centuries
List of philosophers born in the 15th and 16th centuries
List of philosophers born in the 17th century
List of philosophers born in the 18th century
List of philosophers born in the 19th century
List of philosophers born in the 20th century

Philosophers by region 
List of African American philosophers
List of American philosophers
List of British philosophers
List of Canadian philosophers
List of Catholic philosophers and theologians
List of Chinese philosophers
List of Finnish philosophers
List of French philosophers
List of German-language philosophers
List of Icelandic philosophers
List of Iranian philosophers
List of Italian philosophers
List of Jewish American philosophers
List of Jewish scientists and philosophers
List of Korean philosophers
List of Lithuanian philosophers
List of Romanian philosophers
List of Russian philosophers
List of Slovenian philosophers
List of Turkish philosophers

Other 
List of paradoxes
List of rules of inference
Unsolved problems in philosophy

Featured content 
Featured content in philosophy represents the best Wikipedia has to offer on philosophy topics, and undergoes vigorous peer review.

Portals 

A portal is an introductory page for a given topic. It complements the main article of the subject by introducing the reader to key articles, images, and categories that further describe the subject.

:Category:Philosophy portals—portals covering fields in philosophy.

Major traditions in philosophy 
Anarchism Portal

Outlines of philosophy 

An outline is an organized list of topics covered in an area. Each outline shows the structure of its subject and serves as a table of contents to its coverage on Wikipedia.

Core areas of philosophy 
 Outline of aesthetics
 Outline of ethics
 Outline of epistemology
 Outline of logic
 Outline of metaphysics

Other major movements in philosophy 
 Outline of critical theory
 Outline of humanism

Timelines 

Timelines are lists of articles organized chronologically.
Timeline of philosophers
Timeline of Western philosophers
Timeline of Eastern philosophers
List of years in philosophy

Glossaries 

A glossary page presents definitions for specialized terms in a subject area. Glossaries contain a small working vocabulary and definitions for important or frequently encountered concepts, usually including idioms or metaphors useful in a subject area.
Glossary of Stoicism terms

Categories 
Categories can be used by readers to find sets of articles on related topics. Categories can also be defined as subcategories of other categories.

Categorical index – an index of major categories, arranged by subject – that section of the page is an exception to the category autogeneration rule, as it is crafted by hand.
:Category:Philosophy—the highest level or "root" category for philosophy in Wikipedia – its autogenerated entries are listed at the bottom of the page.